Thermidor was a month in the French Republican calendar.

Thermidor (play) is a dramatic play by the 19th-century French playwright Victorien Sardou, named after the month.
Lobster Thermidor is a French dish made of lobster, named after the play.
The Thermidorian Reaction or 9 Thermidor was a revolt in the French Revolution.
Thérésa Tallien was called Notre-Dame du Thermidor.
Thermidor Records is a defunct record label founded by Joe Carducci.
A competitive robot in Robot Wars as Thermidor 2.

See also 
Thermador